Berdskoye Highway is a street connecting Novosibirsk and Berdsk. It starts from the bridge across the Inya River, runs south through Pervomaisky and Sovetsky districts of Novosibirsk, then crosses the Berd Bay and ends at the intersection of Pervomaiskaya and Vokzalnaya streets of Berdsk.

Berdskoye Highway is a part of Federal Highway R256.

According to a Yandex study (2017), it is the third-longest street in Russia. Its length is 20.4 km (12.7 mi).

History
Construction of the highway began in 1930. The head of the road works was Nikolai Vekshin.

In 1932, road works were almost completed.

Gallery

Attractions
 Novosibirsk Museum of Railway Engineering

See also
 Sovetskoye Highway

References

Streets in Novosibirsk
Pervomaysky District, Novosibirsk
Sovetsky District, Novosibirsk
Berdsk